Liu Shunsong  (1 December 1952 – 30 August 2022) was a Taiwanese politician.

Biography
He was member of the Miaoli County Council from 2014 until his death in 2022, representing the Democratic Progressive Party.
Liu died due to COVID-19 at the Taipei Veterans General Hospital, on 30 August 2022, at the age of 69.

References

1952 births
2022 deaths
Deaths from the COVID-19 pandemic in Taiwan
Democratic Progressive Party (Taiwan) politicians
Politicians of the Republic of China on Taiwan from Miaoli County